In music, Op. 62 stands for Opus number 62. Compositions that are assigned this number include:

 Arnold – Toy Symphony
 Beethoven – Coriolan Overture
 Chopin – Nocturnes, Op. 62
 Dvořák – My Home
 Elgar – Romance for bassoon
 Mendelssohn – Songs without Words, Book V
 Ippolitov-Ivanov – Turkish Fragments
 Schumann – 3 Gesänge (partsongs with piano ad lib)
 Scriabin – Piano Sonata No. 6
 Tchaikovsky – Pezzo capriccioso